Marina like harbor situated at the end of Quai Gustave-Ador and the beginning of the Quai de Cologny in Geneva, Switzerland.

Here you can see the statue La Brise (The Breeze) which was sculpted by Henry Koenig in 1939.

This is a location of historical and symbolic importance: it was here that on 1 June 1814 two Swiss contingents, Soleure and Fribourg, landed. This event led to the integration of Geneva into the Swiss confederation on 19 May 1815.

See also 
 Switzerland in the Napoleonic era
 History of Geneva

References 

Tourist attractions in Geneva
History of Geneva
Buildings and structures in Geneva